The Extraordinary and Plenipotentiary Ambassador of Peru to Malaysia is the official representative of the Republic of Peru to Malaysia.

The ambassador in Kuala Lumpur is also accredited to neighbouring Cambodia and Brunei.

Both countries established diplomatic relations in the 1990s and have maintained them since. Peru maintains an embassy in Kuala Lumpur.

List of representatives

See also
List of ambassadors of Malaysia to Peru
List of ambassadors of Peru to Singapore

References

Malaysia
Peru